Yasuoka may refer to:

Yasuoka (surname), a Japanese surname
Yasuoka, Nagano, a village located in Shimoina District, Nagano Prefecture, Japan
Yasuoka Station, Shimonoseki, Yamaguchi Prefecture